Misfit is a 2017 Dutch family film. The film earned $2.0 million dollars upon its initial release making it the fourth most visited Dutch film of 2017. The film spawned two sequels, a German remake, a Polish remake, a Latin American remake and a television spin-off for Netflix.

Plot
A popular American high school student moves to the Netherlands and is quickly outcast by her new peers as a 'misfit.'

References

External links 
 

2017 films
Dutch children's films
2010s Dutch-language films